Hal Howard Griswold was a politician from the U.S. state of Ohio. He was the Speaker of the Ohio House of Representatives in 1923 and 1924.

Background
Born in Chardon, Ohio on May 25, 1886, to his parents were Eli J. and Ellen (Mynderse) Griswold. Griswold was educated at the common school and high school of Chardon, and received an A.B from Adelbert College of Western Reserve University.

Griswold studied law in an office and by correspondence, while he taught science and mathematics at Chardon schools, 1909-'10, was principal of Chardon High School, 1910-'11, and Superintendent of Schools at Chardon, 1911-'16. He was a member of the Board of School Examiners, 1911-'16, was admitted to the bar, January 4, 1916, and began practice in Chardon July 1, 1916.

First elected to the Ohio House of Representatives in 1918, Griswold was re-elected in 1920 and 1922. He ran as a Republican. During the last session, 1923 and 1924, he was selected as Speaker of the House.

Personal life
Hal Howard Griswold was married to Gertrude L. Carter of Oberlin, Ohio on July 23, 1914. They had at least one daughter. He was a member of the Independent Order of Odd Fellows, Knights of Pythias, and Phi Beta Kappa. During World War I he was Chairman of the United War Work Campaign, and spoke for the Red Cross and Liberty Loan campaigns. Griswold died in 1953, and is buried in Chardon.

References

Bibliography

1886 births
1953 deaths
Speakers of the Ohio House of Representatives
Republican Party members of the Ohio House of Representatives
People from Chardon, Ohio
Case Western Reserve University alumni
20th-century American politicians